Manoj Sarathchandra (born 6 February 1993) is a Sri Lankan cricketer who plays for Tamil Union Cricket and Athletic Club. In March 2019, he was named in Kandy's squad for the 2019 Super Provincial One Day Tournament.

References

External links
 

1993 births
Living people
Sri Lankan cricketers
Tamil Union Cricket and Athletic Club cricketers
People from Kandy
Kandy Crusaders cricketers
Wicket-keepers